Odostomia callipyrga is a species of sea snail, a marine gastropod mollusc in the family Pyramidellidae, the pyrams and their allies.

Description
The white, oblong-ovate shell is somewhat ventricose. Its length measures 2.2 mm. The  whorls of the protoconch are nearly half immersed in the first of the succeeding turns. The four whorls of the teleoconch are somewhat inflated, moderately contracted at the periphery and moderately shouldered at the summit. They are marked by strong spiral cords of which 2 appear upon the first, 3 upon the second, and 4 upon the penultimate turn between the sutures. These cords are separated by well impressed, narrow, spiral grooves which are crossed by slender axial threads. The periphery and the base of the body whorl are well rounded, marked by four spiral cords, similar to those on the spire, the space between which is ornamented like the grooves in the spire. The aperture is oval. The posterior angle is acute. The outer lip is thin, showing the external sculpture within. The columella is slender, somewhat curved and slightly reflected, provided with a fold at its insertion.

Distribution
This species is found in the Bay of Panama.

References

External links
 To World Register of Marine Species

callipyrga
Gastropods described in 1904